Afghanurus is a genus of mayflies in the family Heptageniidae.

References 

 

Mayflies
Mayfly genera